Cornufer cryptotis is a species of frog in the family Ceratobatrachidae.
It is endemic to West Papua, Indonesia.

Its natural habitats are subtropical or tropical moist lowland forests, rural gardens, and heavily degraded former forest.

References

cryptotis
Amphibians of Western New Guinea
Taxonomy articles created by Polbot
Amphibians described in 1999